Saurian Meditation is the first solo album by Karl Sanders, the vocalist/guitarist of the technical death metal band Nile. It was released on 26 October 2004 through Relapse Records. The music is a full length exploration of the atmospheric interludes heard on Nile's previous albums, and still draws on ancient Babylonia and Lovecraftian themes for inspiration. The album was well received by metal and non-metal listeners alike.

Track listing
"Awaiting the Vultures" – 3:52
"Of the Sleep of Ishtar" – 9:35
"Luring the Doom Serpent" – 4:00
"Contemplations of the Endless Abyss" – 3:43
"The Elder God Shrine" – 7:33
"Temple of Lunar Ascension" – 3:51
"Dreaming Through the Eyes of Serpents" – 6:16
"Whence No Traveler Returns" – 5:36
"The Forbidden Path Across the Chasm of Self-Realization" – 5:53
"Beckon the Sick Winds of Pestilence" – 6:04

Personnel
 Karl Sanders - baglama saz, acoustic guitar, electric guitar, ebow, guitar synthesizer, keyboards, bass guitar
 Mike Brezeale - vocals
 Pete Hammoura - drums, percussion

Special guests
 Shawn Allen - acoustic guitar on "Whence No Traveler Returns"
 Dallas Toler-Wade - harmony vocals on "The Elder God Shrine"
 David Vincent - narration on "The Forbidden Path Across the Chasm of Self Realization"
 Juan Gonzalez - drums on "Beckon the Sick Winds of Pestilence", lead gong on "Whence No Traveler Returns", harmony vocals on "The Elder God Shrine"

References

2004 debut albums
Karl Sanders albums
Relapse Records albums